Nikolay Kononov (24 August 1980 in Moscow, USSR) is a Russian writer and journalist. He was editor-in-chief of The Firm's Secret from 2014 to 2017, then editorial director until 2018. The author of four books: Deux Sine Machina: Stories of 20 crazy people who made business in Russia from scratch (2011), Code of Durov. The real story of the social network "VKontakte" and its creator (2012), Author, scissors, paper. How to write impressive texts quickly. 14 lessons (2017), The Uprising (2019), and The Night We Fled (2022).

Biography

Media 
In 2002 Kononov graduated from the Department of Literary and Art Criticism and Publicism of the Faculty of Journalism at Moscow State University. In 2003-2004 he worked as a reporter for the newspapers Izvestia and Stolichnaya Vechernaya, was focused on social issues, covering e.g. problems of the refugees in Ingush field camps and local elections in Chechnya. In 2004-2005 he was a special correspondent in the Expert. From 2005 to 2010 he worked as a columnist and editor in Russian edition of Forbes. In 2010-2011 he worked as one of the four senior editors of Slon.ru. In 2011 he returned to Forbes and took part in launching the website Forbes.ru, worked on profiles of outstanding entrepreneurs and conducted investigations about oligarchs' tights with Kremlin, explosions on coal mines in Kuzbass, future of oil industry in Siberia, etc.

From 2012 to 2015, he was the editor-in-chief of Hopes & Fears – the daily online newspaper about the new generation of entrepreneurs. After the latter had been merged with The Village, Kononov became the editorial director of Look At Media.

In January 2015, Kononov moved to The Firm's Secret as an editor-in-chief. Four key employees of the editorial staff followed him, and then almost the entire team of Hopes & Fears left. According to Kononov, a series of decisions by the holding management prompted him to quit: first – the merge of H&F with The Village, which meant closing the business online newspaper that raised a monthly audience of about 800 thousand people in a year and a half, and then – using a successful name for a new English-languagelifestyle newspaper.

Literature 
In 2003 Kononov wrote first short story, "Specificus and Dieffenbach", it was published in Russian literary magazine
Vavilon under pseudonyme Grigorii Mikhailov. In 2009 second story "Islands, Dreams" opened March issue of literary magazine Text Only.

In 2011 he published the book Deux Sine Machina: The Stories of 20 Crazy People who Made Business from Scratch in Russia (in 2012 the book was included in the short list of the literary award NOS). In 2012, the second book came out — Code of Durov. The Real Story of the Social Network "VKThe Firm's Secret ontakte" and Its Creator. The adaptation rights for it were obtained by AR Films, a company of Alexander Rodnyansky, but the film's release (first planned for 2014) was postponed until an indefinite period. In March 2014, The New York Times published a column of Nikolay Kononov, in which he summarized the further history of Pavel Durov and his social network.

In 2013 was published in "Seans" magazine a short story "The Shiver" about Moscow opposition anti-Putin rally. In the spring of 2017 came out the third book by Nikolay Kononov Author, scissors, paper. How to write impressive texts quickly. 14 lessons dedicated to practical writing techniques for journalists. 

The fourth book The Uprising came out in 2019. It is a fiction novel based on ego-documents and archival documents. The book tells about Sergei Solovyov, one of the leaders of the uprising of prisoners in the Norilsk camp in 1953. The Uprising will be translated to French and published by Noir sur Blanc. In 2019 the book was included in the short list of the literary award NOS.

The fifth book was released by the publishing house Individuum Book in the fall of 2022. The novel The Night We Fled tells about Russian stateless people after the First World War and displaced persons after the Second World War.

Books

Awards and honors 
 Journalism awards
 2017 — independent journalist award Redkollegiya for a best story in Russian for multimedia longread "Archipelago FSIN: How does Russian prison system works"
 2015 — was nominated for the title of journalist of the year by GQ Man of the Year 2015 Award
 2015 — entered the top of media rating Pricewaterhouse in the nomination "Media on the Internet"
 Literary awards
 2019 — NOS, The Uprising, short-list; National Bestseller, The Uprising, long-list Yasnaya Polyana, The Uprising, long-list; The Big Book, The Uprising, long-list
 2014 — NOS, Durov's Code, long-list; National Bestseller, Durov's Code, long-list
 2013 — NOS, Deux Sine Machine, short-list

External links

References

1980 births
Living people
Russian male journalists
Russian male writers
Online journalists
Journalists from Moscow
Redkollegia award winners